The 2004 Turkmenistan Higher League (Ýokary Liga) season was the twelfth season of Turkmenistan's professional football league. Ten teams competed in 2004.

Results

External links
 

Ýokary Liga seasons
Turk
Turk
1